Reichman University is Israel's only private university, located in Herzliya, Tel Aviv District. It was founded in 1994 as the IDC Herzliya private college, before being rebranded in 2021.

It receives no direct government funding, and in August 2021 became Israel's first private university.

History
Reichmann University was founded in 1994 by Uriel Reichman as the Israeli private college Interdisciplinary Center Herzliya (IDC Herzliya).

The campus is located in the city of Herzliya, Israel, six miles north of the city Tel Aviv, on the grounds of a former Israeli Air Force base. It served the first squadron of the air force for three months in the War of Independence.

In 2009, Alpha Epsilon Pi opened the first college fraternity in Israel at the IDC.

In 2012, the college attracted controversy for the School of Sustainability being funded by Israel's major polluting companies.

In 2018, the college was authorized by the state council to run several doctoral courses but was not permitted to brand itself as a university. In 2021, the college was permitted to brand itself as a university.

The school does not receive direct government funding.

Academic ranking 
In its 2022 rankings, Times Higher Education rated the university in the 801–1000th bracket.

Faculties
The university's faculties are:
 Lauder School of Government, Diplomacy and Strategy
 Raphael Recanati International School
 Arison School of Business
 Efi Arazi School of Computer Science
 Sammy Ofer School of Communications
 Baruch Ivcher School of Psychology
 Tiomkin School of Economics
 School of Sustainability and Law

Herzliya Conference

The Herzliya Conference is a forum for policy speeches which is hosted by the Interdisciplinary Center at Herzliya.

Administration

Key staff include:
 Rafi Melnick - president
 Uriel Reichman – founder and former president
 Alex Mintz – provost
Zvi Eckstein, dean of the School of Economics and School of Business
Boaz Ganor, dean of the School of Government, Diplomacy and Strategy

See also
Education in Israel

References

Reichman University
Educational institutions established in 1994
1994 establishments in Israel
Law schools in Israel